Ottavio Dantone (born 9 October 1960) is an Italian conductor and keyboardist (primarily harpsichord and fortepiano) particularly noted for his performances of Baroque music. He has been the music director of the Accademia Bizantina in Ravenna since 1996.

Career
Dantone trained at the Conservatorio "Giuseppe Verdi" in Milan where he graduated in organ and harpsichord. In 1985 he was awarded the Basso Continuo prize at the International Paris Festival and was also a laureate in the 1986 International Bruges Festival.

Dantone made his debut as an opera conductor in 1999 with the first performance in modern times of Giuseppe Sarti's Giulio Sabino at the Teatro Alighieri in Ravenna. He made his La Scala debut in 2005 conducting Handel's Rinaldo, and would conduct performances of the same opera at Glyndebourne in 2011.

Selected Recordings
Domenico Scarlatti: Complete Sonatas – Ottavio Dantone (harpsichord). Label: Stradivarius (CD)
Settecento Veneziano – Accademia Bizantina, Ottavio Dantone (conductor). Label: Arts Music (CD)
Sarti: Giulio Sabino – Accademia Bizantina, Ottavio Dantone (conductor). Label: Bongiovanni (CD)
Vivaldi: Tito Manlio – Nicola Ulivieri, Karina Gauvin, Ann Hallenberg, Marijana Mijanovic, Debora Beronesi, Barbara Di Castri; Accademia Bizantina, Ottavio Dantone (conductor). Label: Naïve (CD)
Vivaldi: In Furore, Laudate Pueri, Concerti Sacri – Sandrine Piau, Stefano Montenari, Accademia Bizantina, Ottavio Dantone (conductor). Label: Naïve (CD, 2006)
Il Giardino Armonico Deux: Music of the French Baroque - Giovanni Antonini (flute), Luca Pianca (lute), Enrico Onofri (violin), Vittorio Ghielmi (viola da gamba), Ottavio Dantone (harpsichord). Recorded in the Hellbrunn Palace, Salzburg. Label: Arthaus Musik (DVD)
Pergolesi: Adriano in Siria with Livietta e Tracollo DVD
Pergolesi: Il Flaminio DVD
Vivaldi: Il Giustino – Accademia Bizantina, Ottavio Dantone (conductor). Label: Naive (CD)

Notes and references

Sources
El Diario Vasco, Recuperador de lo desconocido, 20 October 2009. Accessed 10 November 2009 (in Spanish).
Freeman, John W., Review: Sarti: Giulio Sabino, Opera News, December 2000. Accessed 10 November 2009.
Il Resto del Carlino, Abbado, Dantone, e fuochi d'artificio, 19 April 2007. Accessed 10 November 2009 (in Italian). 
Morreau, Annette Review:Accademia Bizantina/Dantone/Scholl, Barbican, London, The Independent, 28 November 2006. Accessed 10 November 2009.
Osella, Leonardo, Annibale e Paisiello a Torino dopo 236 anni, ma senza Mozart; La dirigerà uno specialista come Ottavio Dantone alla testa dell’Accademia Bizantina e altri cantanti, La Stampa, 23 February 2007. Accessed 10 November 2009 (in Italian).

External links
Official web site

1960 births
People from Cerignola
Italian male conductors (music)
Italian harpsichordists
Living people
21st-century Italian conductors (music)
21st-century Italian male musicians